The L Line is a light rail line which is part of the light rail system operated by the Regional Transportation District in the Denver–Aurora Metropolitan Area in Colorado. The L Line opened as part of a service change in 2018 and is formed by a truncated section of the D Line, which formerly served the route.

Route 
The L Line's northern terminus is in Five Points northeast of downtown Denver. From 30th & Downing station, it runs southwest along Welton Street before turning down 19th Street. On trips toward downtown, the line runs along Stout Street; on trips leaving downtown, the line loops back at 14th Street before serving stations on California Street and then heading back to 30th & Downing along Welton Street.

Proposed extension 
The Central Rail Extension Mobility Study Final Report proposed that the D Line stations from 20th & Welton to 30th & Downing and future extension stations be operated on an independent route. This route would operate from the downtown loop to a new terminus created by sharing the A Line's 38th & Blake station. Former D Line riders would have to transfer to the new L Line as the D Line's new northern terminus would be the downtown loop (nominally 18th & California station). The 14th & California station closed in 2004 could be restored to support the L Line at the Convention Center, allowing for transfers to Theatre District–Convention Center station. RTD's Board of Directors approved the introduction of the current shorter version of the L Line with the January 14, 2018 service changes. The L Line uses existing track between 30th & Downing station and the downtown loop.

Stations

References

External links 

RTD L Line
RTD L Line schedule

RTD light rail
Transportation in Denver
Railway lines opened in 2018
750 V DC railway electrification
2018 establishments in Colorado